The 1990–91 season of the European Cup Winners' Cup was won by Manchester United against Barcelona. The victory for United was made significant as it was the season English clubs returned to European football, after completing a five-year ban as a result of the Heysel Stadium disaster.

Teams
A total of 33 teams participated in the competition. Yugoslav Cup winners Red Star Belgrade won the double, and cup runners-up Hajduk Split were disqualified, so no representative of Yugoslavia participated.

Notes

Qualifying round

|-

|}

First leg

Second leg

Trabzonspor won 3–1 on aggregate.

First round

|-

|}

† Order of legs reversed after original draw

First leg

Second leg

Aberdeen won 5–0 on aggregate.

Legia Warsaw won 6–0 on aggregate.

Olympiacos won 5–1 on aggregate.

Sampdoria won 2–1 on aggregate.

Manchester United won 3–0 on aggregate.

Wrexham won 1–0 on aggregate.

Montpellier won 1–0 on aggregate.

Steaua București won 6–1 on aggregate.

Dynamo Kyiv won 6–2 on aggregate.

Dukla Prague won 4–1 on aggregate.

Fram won 4–1 on aggregate.

Barcelona won 7–3 on aggregate.

RFC Liège won 5–0 on aggregate.

2–2 on aggregate. Estrela da Amadora won 4–3 on penalties.

Austria Wien won 2–0 on aggregate.

Juventus won 8–1 on aggregate.

Second round

|-

|}

First leg

Second leg

Legia Warsaw won 1–0 on aggregate.

Sampdoria won 4–1 on aggregate.

Manchester United won 5–0 on aggregate.

Montpellier won 8–0 on aggregate.

Dynamo Kyiv won 3–2 on aggregate.

Barcelona won 5–1 on aggregate.

RFC Liège won 2–1 on aggregate.

Juventus won 8–0 on aggregate.

Quarter-finals

|-

|}

First leg

Second leg

Manchester United won 3–1 on aggregate.

Legia Warsaw won 3–2 on aggregate.

Barcelona won 4–3 on aggregate.

Juventus won 6–1 on aggregate.

Semi-finals

|-

|}

First leg

Second leg

Manchester United won 4–2 on aggregate.

Barcelona won 3–2 on aggregate.

Final

Top goalscorers
The top scorers from the 1990–91 European Cup Winners' Cup are as follows:

References

External links
 1990-91 competition at UEFA website
 Cup Winners' Cup results at Rec.Sport.Soccer Statistics Foundation

3
UEFA Cup Winners' Cup seasons